The 1991 population census in Bosnia and Herzegovina was the last census of the population undertaken in the Socialist Republic of Bosnia and Herzegovina before the Bosnian War. It was conducted during the final week of March 1991. For the 1991 census there were 109 municipalities of which ten were part of Sarajevo.

Usage
As the next census of Bosnia and Herzegovina was not held until 2013, the 1991 census was used as the basis for institutionalized affirmative action practices in the country, which ensure equal or proportional representation of the country's "constituent peoples" (Bosniaks, Croats and Serbs) in public institutions. Due to the ethnic cleansing campaigns that took place during the 1992 to 1995 war, the data for ethnicity was expected to be highly inaccurate.

Overall

By municipality

Absolute ethnic majority

Relative ethnic majority

NOTE: There seems to be a discrepancy in the above-listet numbers. The total listet for Croats is 1,402 larger than the sum total of the numbers listet for the municipalities. The error does not seem to be in the Sarajevo municipality and its neighbourhoods.

See also

Bosniaks
Serbs of Bosnia and Herzegovina
Croats of Bosnia and Herzegovina
1953 population census in Bosnia and Herzegovina

Notes

References

 Official results from the book: Ethnic composition of Bosnia-Herzegovina population, by municipalities and settlements, 1991. census, Zavod za statistiku Bosne i Hercegovine - Bilten no.234, Sarajevo 1991.

Population Census In Bosnia And Herzegovina, 1991
Population
Censuses in Bosnia and Herzegovina
Bosnia